Edward Alan Stein (born November 22, 1946) is a liberal American cartoonist and former editorial cartoonist for the now-closed Rocky Mountain News in Denver, Colorado. Stein drew editorial cartoons five days a week,  and previously published a local daily comic strip called Denver Square. Stein continues to draw editorial cartoons, which are syndicated by United Media, and have been printed in newspapers across the world in many languages. On September 20, 2010, Stein launched a syndicated national comic strip, entitled Freshly Squeezed.

Education
Stein attended high school in Waco, Texas and college at the University of Denver, graduating with a B.F.A in 1969.

Other work
Stein worked for many Colorado-based publications including Cervi's Journal and The Rocky Mountain Business Journal (since renamed, Colorado Business Journal) before joining the Rocky Mountain News as staff editorial cartoonist in 1978, a position he has held ever since. He was the President of the Association of American Editorial Cartoonists in 1988. In 2006, Stein co-hosted the 2006 AAEC Cartoonist's Convention, which was held in Denver.

Awards and Prizes
  Scripps Howard National Journalism Award, 1999.
  Special Category Award for Cartoons Relating to September 11 and Honorable Mention, Fischetti Editorial Cartoon Competition, 2002.
  John Fischetti Award for Editorial Cartooning, 2006.
 James Aronson Award for Social Justice Journalism and Cartooning with a Conscience 2008.

Published works
  Denver Square: We Need a Bigger House, 2003, a collection of cartoons about life in Denver from Ed's Denver Square comic strip
  Stein's Way: Editorial Cartoons by Ed Stein, 1983, a collection of editorial cartoons

See also
  Rocky Mountain News
  Association of American Editorial Cartoonists

External links
 EdSteinInk.com, Stein's Personal Website
  Editorial Cartoons Blog at RockyMountainNews.com
 Denver Square Blog at RockyMountainNews.com

Notes

1946 births
Living people
American comics artists
American editorial cartoonists
University of Denver alumni
Rocky Mountain News people